The Grand Duchess and the Waiter is a 1926 American silent romantic comedy film directed by Mal St. Clair and starring Florence Vidor and Adolphe Menjou. The film is based on a 1925 Broadway play of the same name starring stage actress Elsie Ferguson, who had recently returned to Broadway after years in the film colony. A print of this film is preserved at the Library of Congress.

Plot
As described in a film magazine review, a Paris millionaire becomes infatuated with a grand duchess. Ignored in his efforts to meet her, he becomes a floor-waiter in the suite which the royal guests occupy. He fails miserably in this job and the grand duchess, to punish him, makes him a member of her cortege, and assigns him to very menial labor. The duchess, however, finally falls in love with him but is forced to repulse him when others of the royal party find her in the waiter’s arms after she has swooned. Months later, while despondently searching for her, the waiter finds her the proprietor of a humble inn and they are reunited.

Cast

Home media
The film has been issued on VHS but has yet to see a DVD release.

See also
The House That Shadows Built (1931 promotional film by Paramount with excerpt of this film)

References

External links

Lantern slide (Wayback Machine)
Stills at www.silentsaregolden.com

1926 films
1926 romantic comedy films
American silent feature films
Films directed by Malcolm St. Clair
American romantic comedy films
American black-and-white films
American films based on plays
Silent romantic comedy films
1920s American films
Silent American comedy films